Westmorland County may refer to more than one place:

Westmorland County, New Brunswick, Canada
Westmorland, England, now part of Cumbria